The Éditions des Équateurs is a French publishing house founded by Olivier Frébourg in 2003.

Located in Normandy, it proposes a diversified catalog of works of fiction (novels, short stories, narratives) and documents (History, testimonies ...).

Series 
 Novels
 Short stories
 Équateurs parallèles
 Travels
 Narratives
 Essais
 Documents
 History.
 Art books
 Hors collection
 Inclassables.

References

External links 
 Official website
 Jérôme Garcin, "Les Equateurs tiennent le cap", bibliobs.nouvelobs, 12 March 2009 
 
 Les Éditions des Équateurs on the website of Ste Marguerite-sur-mer

Book publishing companies of France
2003 establishments in France
Publishing companies established in 2003